Pisidium obtusale is a species of freshwater bivalve from family Sphaeriidae.

Description
The 2.5–3.5mm. shell is very tumid (swollen). It is an angular-oval shape with broad, rounded umbos which are behind the midpoint. The surface (periostracum) is glossy with fine concentric striae. Numerous pores are visible inside the shell. The colour is whitish to yellowish often coated with a red-brown deposit.

Distribution
Its native distribution is Holarctic.

 Czech Republic – in Bohemia, in Moravia, near threatened (NT)
 Germany – (Arten der Vorwarnliste)
 Nordic countries: Denmark, Faroes, Finland, Iceland, Norway and Sweden
Great Britain and Ireland

References

External links
 Pisidium obtusale at Animalbase taxonomy,short description, biology,status (threats), images
Images at BOLD.
 Pisidium obtusale illustrated in Danmarks Fauna (Georg Mandahl-Barth)

obtusale
Taxa named by Jean-Baptiste Lamarck
Bivalves described in 1818